James Cosgrove  was a Byker, Newcastle upon Tyne, England, born concert hall singer and humourist/comedian whose career spanned the 19th and 20th centuries.

Career 
Born in Byker, he used the pseudonym "J C Scatter". He is credited with making the first recording of the "Blaydon Races" in 1908 and in doing so brought the song back from obscurity to become one of the main Tyneside anthems, although using a slightly different melody. James Cosgrove performed on stage all over the country and continued to do so until the 1940s. He would arrive on stage through the curtains, dressed as his female fruit seller, and juggled with oranges while singing his "Orange Lass". He was one of the greats, and left a legacy of Geordie humour and dialect.

Works 
His songs include (together with known recording dates):

 "Blaydon Races" – (recorded 1909)
 "Blaydon Races" – (recorded 1929)
 "The Tyneside Policeman"
 "Wor Nanny's a mazer"
 "Orange Lass" – (recorded 1929)

Legacy 
James Cosgrove as J C Scatter made several recordings, some towards the end of his career. His 1909 recording of "Blaydon Races" also survives, but the quality has deteriorated. Several of these survived and two of these songs are available on the CD "Various Artists - Wor Nanny's A Mazer: Early Recordings Of Artists From The North East 1904-1933" (on Phonograph, PHCD2K1)

The full list of tracks on this CD are as follows :

See also

 Geordie dialect words

References

External links
The Northumberland Anthology
J C Scatter sings Blaydon Races
J C Scatter sings Orange Lass
J C Scatter sings "Orange Lass" The Northumberland Anthology

English male singers
English male comedians
People from Newcastle upon Tyne (district)
People from Gateshead
Musicians from Tyne and Wear
Geordie songwriters
Year of birth missing
Year of death missing